Daphne oleoides is a shrub of the family Thymelaeaceae.  It is native to the southern Europe, northern Africa, and Asia Minor.

Description
The shrub is evergreen, and grows up to 60 cm tall.  Its branches grow upright. Its flowers are white, with a purplish outside and it bears orange fruits. It is often found on calcareous rocks and rocky slopes at altitudes of 1700 to 2300 m.

Subtaxa
Daphne oleoides subsp. baksanica
Daphne oleoides subsp. kurdica (syn. Daphne kurdica)
Daphne oleoides subsp. transcaucasica
Daphne oleoides var. brachyloba
Daphne oleoides var. buxifolia
Daphne oleoides var. glandulosa

References

oleoides